An undercompressive shock wave is a shock wave that does not fulfill the Peter Lax conditions.

Details
Ordinary shock waves are compressive, that is, they fulfill the Lax conditions: the characteristic speed (in air, the speed of sound) behind the shock is greater than that of the shock itself, which is greater than the characteristic speed in front of the shock. The characteristic speed is the speed of small, travelling perturbations. These conditions seem to be necessary for a shock wave to remain and not decay. If the peak of a wave moves faster than at its base, then the wave front becomes self-sharpening and eventually becomes a nearly discontinuous shock, a sharp wave front which remains so when it travels.

A shock wave is undercompressive if the Lax conditions are not fulfilled. A sharp wave front may remain sharp whilst travelling even when perturbations behind the front travel slower than it.

An experiment can be made to show this with travelling liquid steps : a thick film is spread on a thin one. The liquid steps remain sharp when they travel because the spreading is enhanced by the Marangoni effect. Making little perturbations with the tip of a hair, one can see whether shock waves are compressive or undercompressive.

Notes & references
A.L. Bertozzi, A. Münch, X. Fanton, A.M. Cazabat, Contact Line Stability and "Undercompressive Shocks" in Driven Thin Film Flow, Physical Review Letters, Volume 81, Number 23, 7 December 1998, pp. 5169-5172

Further reading

Non-linear waves and the classical theory of shock waves
J. David Logan. An introduction to nonlinear partial differential equations Wiley-Interscience 1994
G. B. Whitham. Linear and non-linear waves Wiley-Interscience 1974
Peter D. Lax. Hyperbolic systems of conservation laws and the mathematical theory of shock waves Society for industrial and applied mathematics Philadelphia, Pennsylvania 1973, Hyperbolic systems of conservation laws II Comm. Pure Appl. Math., 10 :537-566, 1957

The mathematical theory of undercompressive shock waves
M. Shearer, D.G. Schaeffer, D. Marchesin, P. Paes-Leme. Solution of the Riemann problem for a prototype 2 X 2 system of non-strictly hyperbolic conservation laws Arch. Rat. Mech. Anal. 97 :299-320, 1987
Andrea L Bertozzi, A. Munch, M. Shearer, Undercompressive Shocks in Thin Film Flow, Physica D, 134(4), 431-464, 1999
A. Munch. Shock transition in Marangoni and gravitation driven thin film flow 1999
A. Munch, A. L. Bertozzi, Rarefaction-Undercompressive Fronts in Driven Films, Physics of Fluids (Letters) 11(10), pp. 2812-2814, 1999

Experiments with liquid films
V. Ludviksson, E. N. Lightfoot. The dynamics of thin liquid films in the presence of surface_tension gradients AIChE Journal 17 :5, 1166-1173, 1971
Herbert E. Huppert. Flow and instability of a viscous current down a slope Nature Vol. 300, 427-429, 1982
A.M. Cazabat, F. Heslot, S.M. Troian, P. Carles. Fingering instability of thin spreading films driven by temperature gradients Nature Vol. 346, 824-826 1990

Experimental undercompressive shock waves
X. Fanton. Etalement et instabilités de films de mouillage en présence de gradients de tension superficielle Thèse, LPMC, Collège de France 1998
A.L. Bertozzi, A. Münch, X. Fanton, A.M. Cazabat, Contact Line Stability and "Undercompressive Shocks" in Driven Thin Film Flow, Physical Review Letters, Volume 81, Number 23, 7 December 1998, pp. 5169-5172
T. Dugnolle, Des chocs non-classiques lors de l'étalement forcé d'un liquide, Mémoire de DEA (Paris 6, Physique des Liquides), LPMC, Collège de France 1999

Shock waves